Sérgio Britto (29 June 1923 – 17 December 2011) was a Brazilian actor and film director. He appeared in more than forty films from 1951 to 2008.

Filmography

References

External links
 

1923 births
2011 deaths
Male actors from Rio de Janeiro (city)
Brazilian male film actors
Brazilian male television actors
Brazilian male stage actors
Brazilian film directors
20th-century Brazilian male actors
21st-century Brazilian male actors